Land Reform Ordinance may refer to:

 Kerala State, India, a 1957 proposed act, and a number of subsequent acts in Land reform in Kerala
 Land Reform (Scotland) Act 2003,
 Zimbabwe's 1992 Land Acquisition Act, Land reform in Zimbabwe#Compulsory acquisition

See also
 Land reforms by country
 Land Ordinance (disambiguation)
 Ordinance (disambiguation)